Mai Bakhtawar Airport is an airport near Mithi and Islamkot, Tharparkar District in the Sindh province of Pakistan it is named after Mai Bakhtawar Lashari Shaheed  a farm worker who was murdered during a landlord/tenant confrontation .

It has been constructed by the Civil Aviation Authority of Pakistan at a cost of Rs. 972.07 million at the request of the Sindh Coal Authority to facilitate the development of the Thar coalfield nearby. Clearance for the construction of the airport was given by Pakistan's Ministry of Defence on 25 September 2009 as it lies within  of Pakistan's international border with India.

It is being constructed to cater for Category-C aircraft as per ICAO standards and will have a 7,000 ft. long runway.

The airport would be used for both civil and military air traffic.

See also
List of airports in Pakistan

References

Airports in Sindh